The 1975 Ottawa Rough Riders finished in 1st place in the Eastern Conference with a 10–5–1 record.

Offseason
The Hamilton Tiger-Cats sent Tony Gabriel off to the Rough Riders because Gabriel suggested that the players should get a raise when the East increased the number of games played from 14 to 16 in 1974. Gabriel would lead the Rough Riders and the Eastern Division in receiving.

Quarterback controversy
Jerry Keeling was projected as the starting quarterback for the Rough Riders while Tennessee's Condredge Holloway was expected to be the quarterback of the future. Holloway was selected in the 12th round of the 1975 NFL Draft by New England Patriots  but they were projecting him only as a wide receiver or defensive back.

General Manager Frank Clair made five trips to try to get Holloway signed. Clair also pursued another well known college quarterback, Notre Dame Fighting Irish quarterback Tom Clements. Clements had just been dropped from the Winnipeg Blue Bombers negotiation list and following a substantial bonus offer, signed with Ottawa. After the acquisition of Clements, Holloway soon signed with the club.

Bill Robinson, a Canadian quarterback who led schools to appearances in the 1973 and 1974 Vanier Cup  was trying to earn a spot on the roster as a quarterback.

Robinson competed for the spot against Clements and Holloway. Before training camp, Robinson was treated poorly by the organization as his $13,000 contract was mailed to him. The contract stated that there was no signing bonus and no negotiation.

Tony Gabriel stated that Robinson was the best passer in camp. Even Tom Clements stated that Robinson threw better than him. In an intra squad game, Robinson completed 10 of 13 passes. In his first preseason game, Robinson completed 3 of 6 passes, included a 48-yard pass to Tony Gabriel.

In the three remaining preseason games, Robinson only had 8 minutes of playing time. CFLPA president George Reed was furious at the Rough Riders organization. Fans were highly critical of the poor treatment that Robinson received. The problem was that the Rough Riders guaranteed the contracts of Clements and Holloway. Robinson would be placed on the 21-day injury list with tonsillitis although his tonsils had been removed years earlier. He would make the team as a defensive back and special teams player. Surprisingly, Holloway and Clements developed so quickly that Brancato decided to trade Keeling to the Hamilton Tiger-Cats prior to the season-opener.

Preseason

Regular season

Standings

Schedule

Postseason

Player stats

Passing

Receiving

Rushing

Awards and honours
 CFL's Most Outstanding Canadian Award – Jim Foley (WR)
 CFL's Most Outstanding Rookie Award – Tom Clements (QB)
 CFL's Coach of the Year – George Brancato
 Tom Clements, Frank M. Gibson Trophy
 Tom Clements, All-Eastern Quarterback

References

Ottawa Rough Riders seasons
1975 Canadian Football League season by team